César Campuzano (1905 – July 1970) was a Spanish boxer. He competed in the men's middleweight event at the 1928 Summer Olympics.

References

External links
 

1905 births
1970 deaths
Spanish male boxers
Olympic boxers of Spain
Boxers at the 1928 Summer Olympics
Sportspeople from Redondela
Middleweight boxers